"Yank Me, Crank Me" is a song written and recorded by American rock musician Ted Nugent from his live album Double Live Gonzo!.

Chart positions

1978 singles
Ted Nugent songs
Songs written by Ted Nugent
1978 songs
Epic Records singles